Kumasi (historically spelled Comassie or Coomassie, usually spelled Kumase in Twi) is a city in the Ashanti Region, and is among the largest metropolitan areas in Ghana. Kumasi is located in a rain forest region near Lake Bosomtwe, and is the commercial, industrial, and cultural capital of the historical Ashanti Empire. Kumasi is alternatively known as "The Garden City" because of its many species of flowers and plants in the past. It is also called Oseikrom (Osei Tutu's the first town).

Kumasi is the second-largest city in Ghana, after the capital, Accra. The Central Business District of Kumasi includes areas such as Adum, Bantama, Asawasi, Pampaso and Bompata (popularly called Roman Hill), with a concentration of banks, department stalls, and hotels. Economic activities in Kumasi include financial and commercial sectors, pottery, clothing and textiles. There is a significant timber processing community in Kumasi serving the domestic market. Bantama High Street and Prempeh II Street in Bantama and Adum, respectively, are the business and entertainment hubs in Kumasi.

History

Origins

There is evidence that the area around Kumasi has been kept cleared since the Neolithic age and that the first human settlement was at Lake Bosomtwe.

Etymology
The name Kumasi derives from the Twi language, meaning 'under the Kum tree'. The word "ase" or "asi" means 'under', 'down' or 'below', and is used in many place names in Ghana, such as Obuasi, Daboase, and Kenyasi.

Around the end of the 17th century, the Ashanti Kingdom's chief fetish Priest, Okomfo Anokye planted three kum trees at different places: one at Kwaaman, ruled by the Nananom Ayokofuo; a second one at Apemso-Bankofo, ruled by Nananom Aduanafuo; and a third at a village near Fomena and Amoafo called Oboani, which was ruled by Nananom Ɛkoɔnafuo. Komfuo wanted to see which of these would become a great city for the kingdom, as he was directed by the oracles. The kum tree at Kwaaman flourished so vigorously that the King and his people often sat underneath, and so Kwaaman became Kum-ase, meaning 'under kum.

The tree at Oboani was, however, very tiny and for no apparent reason was relatively short. According to oral tradition, this small tree produced other trees which were all small in size. The name of the village was changed to Kuma, meaning 'small kum.

The kum tree at Apemso-Bankofo did not grow at all. After a few weeks the leaves rotted and the tree fell down; so it was said that the village's kum tree was dead, and the village became Kum-awu, later Kumawu.

Ashanti Empire 

The city rose to prominence in 1695 when it became capital of the Ashanti Empire due to the activities of its ruler Osei Tutu. The ruler of Kumasi, known as the Asantehene, also served as ruler of the empire. With their 1701 victory over Denkyira the Ashanti empire became the primary state among the Ashantis. Parts of the city, including the then royal residence, were burnt by the British in the Third Anglo-Ashanti War of 1874.

Lady Mary Alice Hodgson, the first English lady to visit Ashanti, wrote "The Siege of Kumasi", an account of the siege of the fort by the nationals of Ashanti and of the subsequent march to the coast. (She was the daughter of Hon. W. A. G. Young, C.M.G., former governor of the Gold Coast, and the wife of Sir Frederick Mitchell Hodgson, K.C.M.G., the governor of the Gold Coast in 1900.)

In 1926, following the return of the Ashanti King Prempeh I after a 30-year exile, Kumasi was restored as the ceremonial control over the Ashanti sub-states. The full role of king was restored by the colonial administration in 1935. The city holds an important place in the history of the Ashanti people, as legend claims that it was here Okomfo Anokye received the golden stool.

Geography
The city features a tropical wet and dry climate, with relatively constant temperatures throughout the course of the year. Kumasi averages around 1400 mm (55") of rain per year.

The city almost features two rainy seasons: a longer season from March through July and a shorter rainy season from September to November.

The months of February through to November is one long wet season, with a relative lull in precipitation in August. Similar to the rest of West Africa, Kumasi experiences the harmattan during the "low sun" months. Lasting from December to February, the harmattan is the primary source of the city's dry season.

Climate

Like other parts of Ghana, Kumasi has a tropical savanna climate (Köppen climate classification Aw), with a wet season and a dry season and the temperature being hot year-round. The hottest time of year is from February to May, around the time the wet season starts.

Kumasi receives  of rain over 128 precipitation days, with a distinct wet and dry season like the rest of Ghana. The dry season is short, lasting from November to February. June, the wettest month, receives  of rainfall over 17 precipitation days on average. Kumasi receives 1951.8 hours of sunshine annually on average, with the sunshine being distributed fairly evenly across the year, with a noticeable dip from June to October. March receives the most sunshine, while August receives the least.

Culture

Features of the city include Fort Kumasi (built by in 1896 to replace an Asante fort and now a museum) and the Kumasi Hat Museum. Royal Asante attractions include the Kumasi National Cultural Centre (including the Prempeh II Jubilee Museum with Asante regalia with a reproduction of the golden stool), the Okomfo Anokye Sword, the Asantehene's Palace (built in 1972), and the Manhyia Palace, dating from 1925, now a museum.

Places of worship 

Among the places of worship, which are predominantly Christian churches and temples, are: Methodist Church, Presbyterian Church of Ghana, Church of the Province of West Africa,  (Anglican Communion), Seventh-day Adventist Church Evangelical Presbyterian Church, Ghana (World Communion of Reformed Churches), Christ Apostolic Church International (which was the first Pentecostal church in Ghana) Ghana Baptist Convention (Baptist World Alliance), Lighthouse Chapel International, Church of Pentecost, Assemblies of God, and Catholic Church Archdiocese of Kumasi (Catholic Church). There are also Muslim mosques which include: Kumasi Central Mosque, Ahmadiyya mosque, Alhaj mosque, Kaase-Nhyiaeso mosque and Rahman mosque.

Economy
 
The main occupations in Kumasi are professional, such as services and manufacturing.

Mining and exports

Manufacturing

Kumasi has 50% of the timber industry of Ghana, and the Kaasi Industrial Area plays an important role in the local industry. The Guinness Ghana Breweries are based in Kumasi.

Energy
Solar panels are prevalent in Kumasi and throughout the Ashanti region. Solar energy technology is a major energy source and contributor to electricity generation in the region.

Commerce
Much of the shopping and trading activity in the city takes place at Kumasi's shopping streets, in and around Kejetia Market and Adum. These two areas border each other. There is also heavy economic activities at Bantama and Asafo. Asafo in particular is the printing hub of Kumasi. Most of the printing done in Kumasi and Ashanti Region as a whole is done at Asafo. Kumasi's Ahwiaa (a sub-town in Kumasi) is also well noted for its wood carvings and arts.

FM Stations 

 Adehye FM

Education

Primary school 
There are both government-assisted primary schools in Kumasi and also private primary schools in Kumasi which educate boys and girls between the ages from 6 to 15.

Secondary education

There are elite all-boys and all-girls senior high schools such as Prempeh College, Opoku Ware School, Yaa Asantewaa Girls' Senior High School and St. Louis Senior High School in Kumasi. There are also many elite mixed senior high schools such as Kumasi Academy and Anglican Senior High School, and a host of other public secondary schools, as well as their private counterparts in the city.

Tertiary institutions
The Kwame Nkrumah University of Science and Technology, Kumasi (formerly the Kumasi College of Technology) is the biggest university in the Ashanti Region and the first biggest in Ghana followed by the University of Ghana. Former Secretary-General of the United Nations, Kofi Annan attended this institution.
A number of other public and private universities and tertiary institutions have since been founded in Kumasi, some of which are listed below.

Transportation

Air 
Kumasi is served by the Kumasi Airport. As of May 2020, two airlines offered regularly scheduled flights to Accra. Airlines servicing the airport included Africa World Airlines and Passion Air. In 2013, the Government of Ghana approved expansion plans to the Kumasi Airport to service international flights into the region. The renovation project will span three development stages, with all work expected to be completed by October 2022.

Bus and taxicab
There is public transportation from Kumasi to major cities such as Accra; Tamale, Mim, Ahafo ; Cape Coast, Sunyani; Takoradi; Tema; Ho; Wa; Bolgatanga; Elubo; Aflao, Techiman;
Public transport in the city is provided by transit buses, a mix of privately owned mini-buses known as tro-tros, taxicabs and buses. Tro-tros are usually converted mini-buses that run regular, well-known routes. Some taxis also run regular routes, which cost more but provide for a more comfortable ride.

In 2002, the city introduced the metro bus services, a rapid transit system for public road transport in Kumasi (MetroMass). This was to reduce congestion on roads and to make a larger and more organized bus routine system in the city.

In 2017, Uber introduced services in Kumasi, a year after a successful introduction in Accra.

Rail 
Kumasi is served by the railway lines to Sekondi-Takoradi and Accra. The train service has been suspended for several years because of damaged track, bridges and locomotives. Currently, no trains run to and from Kumasi due to the collapse of the railway corporation. A $6 billion project to upgrade the railways was due to get underway in 2011.

Port 

Sports

The local football (soccer) team, the Kumasi Asante Kotoko has won several national and continental trophies and awards, and serves as a rival to the Accra-based Hearts of Oak. Their Kumasi Sports Stadium, also known as Baba Yara Stadium, was built in 1959, renovated in 1978, and again in 2007 with a seating capacity of 40,000. It is also the home of King Faisal Football Club, a premier division side.

There is the Royal Golf Club which has the Asantehene as president. Former Leeds United and Ghana national football team footballer Tony Yeboah and professional wrestler Kofi Kingston was born in Kumasi, by the real name Kofi Sarkodie-Mensah.

Healthcare

Kumasi has the Komfo Anokye Teaching Hospital to support medical training at the university, the West End Hospital, several other private hospitals, public clinics and hospitals. Recommended private medical facilities include Kumasi Rabito Clinic located at Ahondwo-Daban Kumasi behind the Unity Oil Filling Station. There is also the KNUST hospital that serves people in the university and surrounding communities.

Recreational parks and gardens 
 
Kumasi has four recreational parks which are opened to the public. The list of recreational parks are Abbey's Park which is located some few meters away from Kejetia, Jackson's Park, Hero's Park located on the same premises as the Baba Yara Sports Stadium, and finally the Rattray Park which was commissioned in 2015.

International relations

Twin towns and sister cities
Kumasi is twinned with:

* Numbers in date column list the year of twinning.

See also
 Lake Bosomtwe
 Ashanti Goldfields Corporation
 AngloGold Ashanti

Notes

External links

References 

 
Populated places in the Ashanti Region
Regional capitals in Ghana
Ashanti Empire
Capitals of former nations
Populated places established in 1680
1680 establishments in Africa